Thomas A. Kondla (born November 30, 1946) is an American former professional basketball player.

Career
Kondla was born on November 30, 1946 in Brookfield, Illinois. He attended Riverside Brookfield High School in Riverside, Illinois.

Kondla played at the collegiate level at the University of Minnesota. He was drafted by the Milwaukee Bucks in the seventh round of the 1968 NBA draft, and later played for  the Minnesota Pipers and the Houston Mavericks of the American Basketball Association (ABA).

References

1946 births
Living people
American men's basketball players
Centers (basketball)
Houston Mavericks players
Milwaukee Bucks draft picks
Minnesota Golden Gophers men's basketball players
Minnesota Pipers players
People from Brookfield, Illinois
People from Riverside, Illinois